Folklore is the second album by the Argentine singer Jorge Cafrune, released in Argentina in 1962.

Track listing 
"Zamba de un cantor"
"La olvidada"
"Zamba de abril"
"Cuando nada te debía"
"La Caspi Corral"
"Tata Juancho"
"Voy andando"
"Volvamos pa' Catamarca"
"Zamba correntina"
"El cieguito"
"La atardecida"
"India madre" (2)

Jorge Cafrune albums
1962 albums